The Myanmar Permanent Representative in Geneva is the official representative of the Government in Naypyidaw next the United Nations Office at Geneva.

List of representatives

References 

 
Switzerland
Myanmar